Yuan'an County is a county in the west of Hubei province, People's Republic of China. It is under the administration of the prefecture-level city of Yichang.

Yuanansuchus, an extinct mastodonsauroid temnospondyl, is named after Yuan'an County where its remains were first discovered.

Administrative divisions
Six towns:
Mingfeng, Hualinsi, Jiuxian, Yangping, Maopingchang, Hehua

The only township is Hekou Township

Climate

References

Counties of Hubei
Geography of Yichang